Cagles Crossing is an unincorporated community located in Coahoma County, Mississippi, United States.

References

Unincorporated communities in Coahoma County, Mississippi
Unincorporated communities in Mississippi